Murzinoria is a monotypic moth genus in the subfamily Arctiinae. Its only species, Murzinoria gracilis, is known from the Chinese province of Gansu. Both the genus and species were first described by Vladimir Viktorovitch Dubatolov in 2007. Only one specimen, a female, is known.

References

  (2007). "New tiger moth taxa from Eurasia (Lepidoptera, Arctiidae)". Atalanta. 38 (3/4): 351-359, 419-420 (colour pl. 17-18), Würzburg.

Spilosomina
Monotypic moth genera
Moths of Asia